Josef Karas (born 20 August 1978 in Olomouc, Czechoslovakia, now Czech Republic) is a Czech male decathlete. He previously represented Canada. He set his personal best score (7922 points) in the men's decathlon on 20 June 2007 in Kladno. Karas is a two-time national champion in the men's decathlon (2005 and 2006).

Achievements

References

1978 births
Living people
Czech decathletes
Sportspeople from Olomouc
Czech male athletes
World Athletics Championships athletes for the Czech Republic
Canadian decathletes
Canadian male track and field athletes